Tennis was an African Games event at its inaugural edition in 1965 and has continued to feature prominently at the competition in each of its subsequent editions.

Editions

Events

Medal events

Men's singles

Women's singles

Men's doubles

Women's doubles

External links
 Swimmingresults at the 2007 All-Africa Games (peopledaily.com)

 
Sports at the African Games
African Games
African Games